HIV disease-related drug reactions present in HIV-infected patients, especially those with helper T-cell counts between 25 and 200, immunosuppression that increases the risk for the development of adverse reactions to medications.

See also
HIV
Skin lesion
 List of cutaneous conditions

References

 
Drug eruptions